Roswitha Emonts-Gast (born 13 November 1944) is a Belgian hurdler. She competed in the women's 80 metres hurdles at the 1968 Summer Olympics.

References

1944 births
Living people
Athletes (track and field) at the 1968 Summer Olympics
Belgian female hurdlers
Belgian pentathletes
Olympic athletes of Belgium
People from Karkonosze County
Sportspeople from Lower Silesian Voivodeship